Igor Nikolayevich Zakharov (born 8 June 1966) is a Russian former professional football referee and player.

Club career
As a player, he made his professional debut in the Soviet Second League in 1984 for FC Zorkiy Krasnogorsk.

Referee career
He had several memorable incidents in his referee career. On 25 July 2006 in the game between FC Dynamo Moscow and FC Moscow he gave FC Moscow a corner kick. Dynamo goalkeeper Sergei Ovchinnikov thought that FC Moscow player touched the ball last and aggressively attacked Zakharov, at one point grabbing his shirt. Ovchinnikov was sent off and received a long disqualification. That turned out to be the last professional game Ovchinnikov played. On another occasion a dog ran onto a field in the game Zakharov was officiating. Zakharov showed the dog the yellow card. On 27 July 2008 after a game between FC Shinnik Yaroslavl and FC Terek Grozny Shinnik wanted to test Zakharov for alcohol, claiming he refereed the game while drunk. Zakharov refused to go through the test.

He was an international FIFA referee from 2005 to 2008, retiring from refereeing after the 2008 season.

References

1966 births
Sportspeople from Kaluga
Living people
Soviet footballers
Russian footballers
Association football defenders
FC SKA-Khabarovsk players
FC Okean Nakhodka players
FC Luch Vladivostok players
PFC Krylia Sovetov Samara players
FC Zenit Saint Petersburg players
FC Kuban Krasnodar players
Russian Premier League players
Russian football referees